Joel Henry Silbey (August 16, 1933 – August 7, 2018) was an American historian.

Joel H. Silbey was born on August 16, 1933, to parents Sidney R. and Estelle Silbey. He attended Brooklyn College in his hometown, graduating in 1955, before pursuing graduate study at the University of Iowa, earning his master's and doctoral degrees in 1956 and 1963, respectively. He taught at San Francisco State College, the University of Pittsburgh, and the University of Maryland before joining the Cornell University faculty in 1966. Two years later, Silbey became a full professor and received a Guggenheim Fellowship. He was appointed President White Professor of History in 1986, serving until retirement in 2002. He died at the age of 84 on August 7, 2018.

References

1933 births
2018 deaths
20th-century American historians
American male non-fiction writers
21st-century American historians
21st-century American male writers
Brooklyn College alumni
Writers from Brooklyn
Cornell University faculty
San Francisco State University faculty
University of Maryland, College Park faculty
University of Pittsburgh faculty
Historians of the United States
Political historians
Historians from New York (state)
20th-century American male writers